Flavius Julius Crispus (300 – 326) was the eldest son of the Roman emperor Constantine I, as well as his junior colleague (caesar) from March 317 until his execution by his father in 326. The grandson of the augustus Constantius I, Crispus was the elder half-brother of the future augustus Constantine II and became co-caesar with him and with his cousin Licinius II at Serdica, part of the settlement ending the Cibalensean War between Constantine and his father's rival Licinius I. Crispus ruled from Augusta Treverorum (Trier) in Roman Gaul between 318 and 323 and defeated the navy of Licinius I at the Battle of the Hellespont in 324, which with the land Battle of Chrysopolis won by Constantine forced the resignation of Licinius and his son, leaving Constantine the sole augustus and the Constantinian dynasty in control of the entire empire. It is unclear what was legal status of the relationship Crispus's mother Minervina had with Constantine; Crispus may have been an illegitimate son.

Crispus's tutor in rhetoric was the Late Latin historian of Early Christianity, Lactantius. Crispus may be the young prince depicted on the Gemma Constantiniana, a great cameo depicting Constantine and his wife Fausta, though the depiction may instead be of Fausta's own son, the future augustus Constantius II. While at Augusta Treverorum, Crispus's praetorian prefect for the prefecture of Gaul was the great Junius Annius Bassus. Crispus was three times Roman consul, for the years 318, 321, and 324.

Within two years of the defeat and surrender of Licinius, Constantine had not only put his brother-in-law and former co-augustus to death, but also executed his nephew Licinius II, the son of his sister Flavia Julia Constantia. According to the Latin histories of Ammianus Marcellinus and Aurelius Victor, after a trial whose real circumstances are mysterious, Constantine executed Crispus at Pola (Pula) in 326. Fausta, whose son Constantius II became caesar in November 324, was also put to death, and the Late Greek historian Zosimus and the Byzantine Greek writer Joannes Zonaras wrote that Constantine had accused Crispus of incest with his stepmother. After his death, Crispus was subjected to damnatio memoriae.

Early life
Crispus's year and place of birth are uncertain. He is considered likely to have been born between 299 and 305, possibly as early as 295, somewhere in the eastern Roman Empire.  The earliest date is most likely, since he was being tutored in 309–310 by Lactantius. His mother Minervina was either a concubine or a first wife to Constantine. Nothing else is known about Minervina. His father served as a hostage in the court of Diocletian in Nicomedia, thus securing the loyalty of Constantine's father, Constantius Chlorus, who was caesar to Maximian in the west at this time.

In 307, Constantine allied to the Italian augusti, and this alliance was sealed with the marriage of Constantine to Maximian's daughter Fausta. This marriage has caused modern historians to question his relationship to Minervina and Crispus. If Minervina were his legitimate wife, Constantine would have needed to secure a divorce before marrying Fausta, which would have required an official written order signed by Constantine himself, but no such order is mentioned by contemporary sources. This silence in the sources has led many historians to conclude that the relationship between Constantine and Minervina was informal and to assume her to have been an unofficial lover. However, Minervina might have already been dead by 307. A widowed Constantine would need no divorce.

Neither the true nature of the relationship between Constantine and Minervina nor the reason Crispus came under the protection of his father will probably ever be known. The offspring of an illegitimate affair could have caused dynastic problems and would likely be dismissed, but Crispus was raised by his father in Gaul. This can be seen as evidence of a loving and public relationship between Constantine and Minervina which gave him a reason to protect her son.

The story of Minervina is quite similar to that of Constantine's mother Helena. Constantine's father later had to divorce her for political reasons—specifically, to marry Flavia Maximiana Theodora, the daughter of Maximian. Constantius did not, however, dismiss Constantine as his son, and perhaps Constantine chose to follow the example of his father here as well.

Whatever the reason, Constantine kept Crispus at his side. Surviving sources are unanimous in declaring him a loving, trusting and protective father to his first son. Constantine even entrusted his education to Lactantius, among the most important Christian teachers of that time, who probably started teaching Crispus before 317.

Career
By 313, there were two remaining augusti in control of the Roman Empire—Constantine in the west and his brother-in-law Licinius in the east.

On 1 March 317, the two co-reigning augusti jointly proclaimed three new caesares: Crispus, alongside his younger half-brother Constantine II, and his first cousin Licinius Iunior. Constantine II was the older son of Fausta but was only two years old at the time of his proclamation. Thus only Crispus assumed actual duties.

Constantine apparently believed in the abilities of his son and appointed Crispus as Commander of Gaul. The new caesar soon held residence in Augusta Treverorum (modern Trier), regional capital of Germania.

In January 322, Crispus was married to a young woman called Helena. Helena bore him a son in October of that year. There is no surviving account of the name or later fate of the son. Eusebius of Caesarea reported that Constantine was proud of his son and very pleased to become a grandfather.

Crispus was leader in victorious military operations against the Franks and the Alamanni in 318, 320 and 323. Thus he secured the continued Roman presence in the areas of Gaul and Germania. The soldiers adored him thanks to his strategic abilities and the victories to which he had led the Roman legions.

Crispus spent the following years assisting Constantine in the war against by then hostile Licinius. In 324, Constantine appointed Crispus as the commander of his fleet which left the port of Piraeus to confront Licinius' fleet. The subsequent Battle of the Hellespont was fought at the straits of Bosporus. The 200 ships under the command of Crispus managed to decisively defeat the enemy forces, which were at least double in number. Thus Crispus achieved his most important and difficult victory which further established his reputation as a brilliant general.

Following his navy activities, Crispus was assigned part of the legions loyal to his father. The other part was commanded by Constantine himself. Crispus led the legions assigned to him in another victorious battle outside Chrysopolis against the armies of Licinius.

The two victories were his contribution to the final triumph of his father over Licinius. Constantine was the only augustus left in the Empire. He honoured his son for his support and success by depicting his face in imperial coins, statues, mosaics, cameos, etc. Eusebius of Caesaria wrote for Crispus that he is "an Imperator most dear to God and in all regards comparable to his father."

Crispus was the most likely choice for an heir to the throne at the time. His siblings Constantine II, Constantius II and Constans were far too young and knew very little about the tasks of an emperor. However, Crispus would never assume the throne.

Execution

In 326, Crispus' life came to a sudden end.  On his father's orders he was executed, apparently without trial, at Pola, Istria, in the Augustan regio of Venetia et Histria.  According to Sidonius Apollinaris, Crispus was killed by "cold poison".  Soon afterwards, Constantine had his wife Fausta killed also, according to several sources in a hot bath or bathroom.  Both Crispus and Fausta suffered damnatio memoriae, their names being erased from inscriptions.

The reason for these deaths remains unclear.  The most common explanation given by scholars is based on the accounts of Zosimus and Zonaras: that Crispus was executed due to suspicions that he was involved in an illicit relationship with Fausta.  Recent scholars have been skeptical of this explanation.  For instance, T. D. Barnes argues that as Crispus was based at Trier, and Fausta at Constantinople, they would not have had the opportunity to have an affair, while Hans Pohlsander suggests that the similarity of Zosimus' story to the myth of Phaedra and Hippolytus makes its veracity doubtful.  However, David Woods accepts the ancient evidence that Crispus and Fausta were believed to have had a relationship, suggesting that Fausta fell pregnant, and Crispus was implicated.  According to Woods' theory, Fausta's death was caused by an attempted abortion, while Crispus committed suicide by poison in Pola, having been exiled there as punishment for his adultery.

Other explanations put forward for Crispus' death include that he was executed in order to ensure the succession of his half-brothers, Constantine's sons by Fausta, and that it was unrelated to the death of Fausta; that it was due to Crispus suggesting that Constantine should retire; or that it was due to Crispus plotting against Constantine, possibly with Fausta and Licinius. J. W. Drijvers concludes that the true explanation for the deaths of Crispus and Fausta will never be known.

Consequences
It is said that Constantine looked to pagan priests who were friends of his, such as Sopater of Apamea, for the purification of his soul, but they refused, considering the act committed by Constantine as unforgivable, including the fact that he previously believed in a Christian woman who in her own son, who had shown her love and loyalty so many times.

In literature
Crispus became a popular tragic hero after the success of Bernardino Stefonio's neo-Latin tragedy Crispus, which was performed at the Jesuit Collegio Romano in 1597. Closely modelled on Seneca's Phaedra, this became a model of Jesuit tragedy and one of the main bases for Alessandro Donati's 1631 Ars Poetic and Tarquinio Galluzzi's 1633 Defense of Crispus. The play was adapted for the French stage by François de Grenaille as L'Innocent malhereux (1639) and by Tristan l'Hermite as La Morte de Chrispe ou les maleurs du grand Constantine (1645). It was performed as an opera in Rome (1720) and London (1721), where it was entitled, Crispo: drama, not to mention Donizetti's 1832 opera Fausta. The story is also retold and embellished in chapter 31 of Sir Walter Scott's novel Count Robert of Paris. When Evelyn Waugh reworks the story in his novel Helena (1950), Crispus is innocent.

References

Citations

Sources

External links

290s births
326 deaths
4th-century executions
4th-century Romans
Ancient Roman generals
Caesars (heirs apparent)
Constantine the Great
Constantinian dynasty
Damnatio memoriae
Executed ancient Roman people
Flavii
Generals of Constantine the Great
Heirs apparent who never acceded
Imperial Roman consuls
People executed by hanging
People executed by the Roman Empire
People from Pula
Sons of Roman emperors
Tetrarchy
Year of birth unknown